Gabrielle Genevieve Haugh is an American model and actress who portrayed the role of Jade Michaels on the NBC soap opera Days of Our Lives.

Early life
Haugh was born in Sacramento, California. Prior to moving to Los Angeles in 2014 upon turning 18, she studied theater, musical theater and dance during high school.

Career
Haugh is managed by Cast Images. During her modeling days, she worked with clothing line Forever 21, Jeweliq and Bobi Los Angeles brand and publications like GEV Magazine. In 2015, she featured in the music video for The Dose's "Cold Hands." That same year, she made her film debut when she landed the role of Grace Blalock in The Long Home opposite actor James Franco. In 2016, Haugh landed her first lead role in The Midnight Man as Alex Luster, a girl who summons a creature who goes by the titular name. In December 2016, it was announced that she had joined the cast of NBC soap opera Days of Our Lives, replacing Paige Searcy as Jade Michaels, with her first appearance being January 17, just days after her 21st birthday. In June 2017, Soaps.com announced that, after six months and 34 episodes on Days, Haugh would depart in July.

Personal life 
Haugh is in a relationship with photographer Jason Agron, whom she met in 2014.

Filmography

Film

Television

References

External links
 
 

Actresses from California
American film actresses
American soap opera actresses
American television actresses
Living people
21st-century American women
Year of birth missing (living people)